The West African Dwarf or Djallonké is an African breed or group of breeds of domestic sheep. It is the dominant breed of West and Central Africa. This breed is primarily raised for meat. The Cameroon or Cameroon Dwarf is a breed within this group.

Characteristics
The West African Dwarf is generally white or piebald, the front half being black and the back half white. However, skewbald (tan on white) and the black belly pattern are found, and the Kirdi type are specially selected to be entirely black. The horns are wide at the base, curve backwards, outwards and then forwards again, with a maximum of one and a half coils. The ears are short and pendulous, the neck is long and slender, the chest is deep, the legs are short, the back is long and dished, higher at the withers than at the tail-head, and the tail reaches the hocks.

On average, ewes produce 1.15 to 1.50 lambs per lambing. This breed grows slowly as evaluated in Nigeria in the last 1970s.  The overall growth rates from 0–90, 91–150 and 151–350 days old were 74, 49 and 34 g/day, respectively. This breed is also highly tolerant of trypanosome.  This breed is thought to go into oestrus throughout the year.

Cameroon sheep
The Cameroon is a hair sheep which it sheds yearly in the spring.  Ewes can raise two lamb crops per year. Their most common color is brown with a black belly, head, and legs. Cameroon sheep are more likely accept their newborn lamb than other sheep breeds do which makes them great mothers.

Distribution
The West African Dwarf sheep is found in West Africa, its range extending from Senegal to Chad, Gabon, Cameroon and the Republic of the Congo. It is adapted for life in humid forested areas, sub-humid areas and savannahs. The Kirdi or Poulfouli is a wholly black variant found in northern Cameroon and southwestern Chad.

See also
Pelibuey (sheep)
West African Dwarf goat

References

Further reading
Fitzhugh und Bradford (eds.): Hairsheep of West Africa and the Americas. A genetic resource for the tropics. 1983
R.M. Njwe und Y. Manjeli: Milk yield of Cameroon dwarf blackbelly sheep - Production laitière de moutons Djallonké au Cameroun. In: Small ruminant research and development in Africa - Réseau africain de recherche sur les petits ruminants. ILCA Research Report - 2, 1982, X5520/B

Sheep breeds
Sheep breeds originating in Cameroon
Agriculture in Africa